The Prix Georges-Émile-Lapalme is an award by the Government of Quebec that is part of the Prix du Québec, given to individuals who have made an outstanding contribution to the quality and diffusion of the French language written or spoken in Québec. The activities recognized for this award are culture, communications, education, administration, research, labour, commerce and business.  It is named in honour of Georges-Émile Lapalme.

Winners

References

 Award winners 

Language-related awards
Prix du Québec